Pterophorus leucadactylus is a moth of the family Pterophoridae. It is known from Sri Lanka, Sumba, New Guinea, India, China, Taiwan, Malaya, Sumatra, Java, Borneo, the Philippines, Micronesia, the Bismarck Islands, the Solomon Islands, Australia and Vietnam.

References

External links
Papua Insects

leucadactylus
Moths described in 1864